The women's team épée took place on November 12 at the Grand Palais.

Epée team

References

2010 World Fencing Championships
World